Harry Williams, Jr. (born August 10, 1982 in Augusta, Georgia) is a former American football wide receiver of the National Football League.  He was drafted by the New York Jets in the seventh round of the 2005 NFL Draft.  He played college football at Tuskegee.  While at Tuskegee Harry Williams was initiated into the Lambda Epsilon chapter of Omega Psi Phi fraternity in the Fall of 2002.

Williams was also a member of the Green Bay Packers, New York Giants, Chicago Bears and Houston Texans.

Early years
Williams attended Jackson-Olin High School in Birmingham, Alabama, and was a two-sport star in both football and track. In track, he competed in the 100 meter dash and the 200 meter dash.

Professional career
On August 22, 2008, Williams suffered a neck injury in a preseason game against the Dallas Cowboys.  He was taken off the field on a stretcher immobilized.  Afterward, he recovered from paralysis, with team doctors reporting his condition was "almost normal."  He underwent surgery and walked on his own at the hospital August 28, 2008; however, returning to football is unlikely.

References

External links
Houston Texans bio
New York Jets bio

1982 births
Living people
Players of American football from Augusta, Georgia
Players of American football from Birmingham, Alabama
African-American players of American football
American football wide receivers
Tuskegee Golden Tigers football players
New York Jets players
Houston Texans players
Amsterdam Admirals players
21st-century African-American sportspeople
20th-century African-American people
Ed Block Courage Award recipients